Claus Richter (born 4 November 1948 in Straubing) is a German journalist.

Life 
Richter works in Germany as a journalist. From 1984 to 1987 he was correspondent and studio manager for the ARD in New York City, likewise from 1987 to 1991 in East Berlin. Since 2001 Richter has been a television presenter for magazine show Frontal 21 on ZDF.

Awards 
 1990: Bayerischer Fernsehpreis
 2005: Deutscher Fernsehpreis for "Fall Deutschland"
 2005: Deutscher Wirtschaftsfilmpreis
 2006: Hanns Joachim Friedrichs Award for Frontal 21
 2007: Goldene Kamera for Frontal21

Filmography 

1993 – Götter, Gurus und Ganoven – aus der Goldstadt Bombay
1994 – Wir müssen den Krieg vergessen
1994 – Krieg im Paradies
1995 – Im Zeichen des Totenkopfs – Piraten in Fernost
1995 – Lockende Südsee – Im Banne des großen Feuers / Von Göttern und Götzen in Polynesien
1997 – Tatort Hongkong-Schmuggelboom vor dem Machtwechsel
1998 – Männer, die in die Kälte gingen
1998 – Im Rausch des schwarzen Goldes
1999 – Die neue Seidenstraße
1999 – Zum Sterben ins Kosovo
2000 – Abenteuer Amazonas
2005 – documentation "Fall Deutschland" (together with Stefan Aust)
2006/2007 – documentation "Globalisierung – Wettlauf um die Welt" (together with Stefan Aust)
2009 – documentation "Wettlauf um die Welt – Aufbruch aus der Krise"''' (together with Stefan Aust)
2009 – documentation "Kandidat Steinmeier" (together with Ulf-Jensen Röller)
2009 – documentation "Auferstanden aus Ruinen – Von der SED zur Linkspartei" (together with Stefan Aust)
2010 – documentation Doppelportrait Wulff-Gauck'' (together with Ulf-Jensen Röller)

External links 
 
 Richter and Frontal21 team

References 

German journalists
German male journalists
20th-century German journalists
21st-century German journalists
1948 births
Living people
German male writers
People from Straubing
ARD (broadcaster) people
ZDF people